Maad Ndaah Njemeh Joof (Serer : Maad Ndaah Njeeme Juuf or Mad Ndaah Njeeme Juuf) is one of the patriarchs of the Joof family, himself the medieval King of Laah (or Lâ) in Baol now part of independent Senegal. He ruled from the late 13th century to the early 14th century, . His descendants from the branch of Maad Patar Kholleh Joof (the conqueror) ruled the pre-colonial Kingdoms of Sine, Saloum and Baol, from the 14th century to 1969. The last king of Sine and Saloum (Maad a Sinig Mahecor Joof and Maad Saloum Fode N'Gouye Joof  respectively) died in 1969. After their deaths, the Serer States of Sine and Saloum were incorporated into independent Senegal. His descendants went on to found three royal houses:

The Royal House of Boureh Gnilane Joof (Serer: Mbind Bure Nilaan, other: Keur Bouré Gnilane) - founded by Jaraff Boureh Gnilane Joof
The Royal House of Jogo Siga Joof (Serer: Mbind Jogo Siga, other : Keur Diogo Siga) - founded by Maad a Sinig Jogo Gnilane Joof
The Royal House of Semou Njekeh Joof (Serer: Mbind Sem-Jike, other: Keur Semou Djiké or Keur Semou Ndiké) - founded by Maad Semou Njekeh Joof

Maad Ndaah Njemeh is one of the most significant figures in Serer and Senegambian dynastic history. He stems from the royal line of Lamane Jegan Joof, the 11th century founder and King of Tukar. 

Ndaah Njemeh's three notable sons included Niokhori Ndaah Joof, Mangi Ndaah Joof, and Yungari Ndaah Joof. Niokhori Ndaah is the ancestor of the Joof royal family of Sine and Saloum; Mangi Ndaah the ancestor of the Joof notable family of Baol and the Faal royal family of Baol and Cayor which succeeded the Joof dynasty of Baol (Lingeer Sobel Joof, a descendant of Mangi, is the maternal grandmother of Damel Amari Ngoneh Faal, founder of the Faal dynasty); and Yungari Ndaah is the ancestor of the Joof noble family of Jolof. The former President of Senegal, President Abdou Diouf descended from this branch of the Joof family.

See also
Lamane Jegan Joof
Tukar
Kingdom of Baol
Serer people
Kingdom of Sine
Kingdom of Saloum
Joof family
Boukar Djillakh Faye
Lamane
Lingeer Fatim Beye
Lingeer Ndoye Demba
Lingeer
Serer history (medieval era to present)

Notes and references

Bibliography
"La famille Juuf [in] « L'épopée de Sanmoon Fay », in Éthiopiques, n° 54, vol. 7, 2e semestre 1991
Éthiopiques, Issues 55-56. Fondation Léopold Sédar Senghor, 1991,
Diouf, Niokhobaye, « Chronique du royaume du Sine, suivie de notes sur les traditions orales et les sources écrites concernant le royaume du Sine par Charles Becker et Victor Martin », Bulletin de l'IFAN, tome 34, série B, n° 4, 1972
Klein, Martin A., Islam and Imperialism in Senegal. Sine-Saloum, 1847–1914, Edinburgh University Press, 1968, p. XV
Buschinger, Danielle (ed & trans:  Kloos, Jan Willem), Van den vos Reynaerde: mittelniederländisch - neuhochdeutsch, Presses du Centre d'Etudes médiévales Université de Picardie (1992), p. 59, 

Serer royalty
Joof family
Serer patriarchs
History of Senegal
History of the Gambia
13th-century monarchs in Africa
Maad